Zuid-Holland West (literally West South Holland) is an official region of the province of South Holland in the Netherlands.
 
It consists of the following subregions:
 Haaglanden, municipalities: Delft, Leidschendam-Voorburg, Midden-Delfland, Pijnacker-Nootdorp, Rijswijk, The Hague, Wassenaar, Westland and Zoetermeer
 Regio Holland Rijnland, municipalities: Hillegom, Kaag en Braassem, Katwijk, Leiden, Leiderdorp, Lisse, Noordwijk,  Oegstgeest, Teylingen, Voorschoten and Zoeterwoude

See also 
 Rijnmond
 Zuid-Holland Oost
 Zuid-Holland Zuid

Notes

References 
  Zuid-Holland West, Province of South Holland

Regions of the Netherlands
Regions of South Holland